The Rural Municipality of Keys No. 303 is a rural municipality (RM) in the Canadian province of Saskatchewan within Census Division No. 9 and  Division No. 4.

History 
The RM of Keys No. 303 incorporated as a rural municipality on January 1, 1913.

Geography

Communities and localities 
The following unincorporated communities are within the RM.

Organized hamlets
 Crystal Lake

Demographics 

Attractions 
 Crystal Lake

Government 
The RM's office is located in the Town of Canora.

Government 
The RM of Keys No. 303 is governed by an elected municipal council and an appointed administrator that meets on the first Thursday of every month. The reeve of the RM is Garth Bates while its administrator is Barry Hvidston. The RM's office is located in Canora.

Transportation 
 Saskatchewan Highway 9
 Saskatchewan Highway 49
 Saskatchewan Highway 650
 Saskatchewan Highway 754

See also 
List of rural municipalities in Saskatchewan

References 

K

Division No. 9, Saskatchewan